Dance with a Stranger  is a 1985 British film directed by Mike Newell. Telling the story of Ruth Ellis, the last woman to be hanged in Britain (1955), the film won critical acclaim, and aided the careers of two of its leading actors, Miranda Richardson and Rupert Everett. The screenplay was by Shelagh Delaney, author of A Taste of Honey, and was her third major screenplay. The story of Ellis has resonance in Britain because it provided part of the background to the extended national debates that led to the progressive abolition of capital punishment from 1965.

The theme song "Would You Dance with a Stranger?" was performed by Mari Wilson and was released as a single.

Plot
A former nude model and prostitute, Ruth is manageress of a drinking club in London that has racing drivers as its main clients. Ruth lives in a flat above the bar with her illegitimate son Andy. Another child is in the custody of her estranged husband's family.

In the club, she meets David, an immature, young man from a well-off family who wants to succeed in motor racing but suffers from lack of money and overuse of alcohol. Ruth falls for his looks and charm, but it is a doomed relationship. Without a job, he cannot afford to marry her, and his family would never accept her. When he makes a drunken scene in the club, she is discharged from her job, which means that she is made homeless.

Desmond, a wealthy admirer, secures a flat for her and her son, but she still sees David. When she tells him she is pregnant, he does nothing about it, and she miscarries. Distraught, she goes to a house in Hampstead where she believes David is at a party. He comes out and goes with a girl to a pub. Ruth waits outside the pub, and when he emerges, she shoots him dead with four shots. She is arrested, tried and hanged.

Cast
 Miranda Richardson as Ruth Ellis
 Rupert Everett as David Blakely
 Ian Holm as Desmond Cussen
 Stratford Johns as Morrie Conley 
 Joanne Whalley as Christine 
 Tom Chadbon as Anthony Findlater 
 Jane Bertish as Carole Findlater 
 David Troughton as Cliff Davis 
 Tracy Louise Ward as Girl with Blakeley
 Matthew Carroll as Andy 
 Lesley Manville as Maryanne 
 David Beale as Man in Little Club
 Charon Bourke as Ballroom Singer

Reception
The film made a comfortable profit. Goldcrest Films invested £253,000 in the film and received £361,000, making them a profit of £108,000.

Critical response
On Rotten Tomatoes, the film has an approval rating of 91%, based on reviews from 11 critics.

Accolades

Mike Newell won Award of the Youth at the 1985 Cannes Film Festival for Dance with a Stranger. Miranda Richardson won Best Actress at the Evening Standard British Film Awards, and Ian Holm won Boston Society of Film Critics Awards 1985 for this and other performances.

References

External links 
 
 

1985 films
1985 drama films
British prison drama films
Biographical films about criminals
Films about capital punishment
Women in prison films
Films directed by Mike Newell
Films set in the 1950s
Cultural depictions of Ruth Ellis
1980s English-language films
1980s prison drama films
1980s British films